The Workers' Party or Labour Party (RP) is minor Montenegrin political party which is part of the right-wing Democratic Front. Workers' party currently has one MP in the Parliament of Montenegro, elected from the coalition list For the Future of Montenegro in the 2020 election.

History
The party was established on 3 March 2015 by Janko Vučinić, former union leader. Since its foundation until 2019, RP was a constituent member of the opposition populist Democratic Front (DF) alliance. In March 2019, the Workers' Party left the coalition with Democratic Front.

On 1 May 2019, the Workers' Party decided to sign an agreement with Socialist People's Party (SNP), United Montenegro (UCG) and Independent parliamentary group to form a big tent political alliance under the name For the Benefit of All.

Party leader Vučinić died on October 25, 2019. On November 7, the party announced that party vice-president Željka Savković would replace Vučinić as new party member of Parliament of Montenegro. On December 9, the Workers' Party elected Vučinić's son Maksim Vučinić, an electrical engineer, for the new Party president.

DSI eventually dissolved prior the parliamentary election in August 2020. In July 2020 United Montenegro, jointly with the Workers' Party and Independent group in the parliament (composed of former members of SNP and DEMOS parties), agreed to form a new cultural conservative political alliance under the name Popular Movement (NP), employing a more significant cultural and socially conservative discourse, supporting 2019-2020 clerical protests in Montenegro and Serbian Orthodox Church rights in Montenegro, continuing its activity within the joint electoral list with Democratic Front and the SNP.

Electoral results

Parliamentary elections

References

2015 establishments in Montenegro
Conservative parties in Montenegro
Labour parties
Political parties established in 2015
Social conservative parties
Socialist parties in Montenegro